The Science Subcommittee on Research and Technology is one of five subcommittees of the United States House Committee on Science, Space, and Technology.

Jurisdiction 
The subcommittee has legislative jurisdiction and general and special oversight and investigative authority on all matters relating to science policy including:
 Office of Science and Technology Policy;
 all scientific research, and scientific and engineering resources (including human resources), math, science and engineering education;
 intergovernmental mechanisms for research, development, and demonstration and cross-cutting programs;
 international scientific cooperation;
 National Science Foundation;
 university research policy, including infrastructure and overhead;
 university research partnerships, including those with industry;
 science scholarships;
 issues relating to computers, communications, and information technology;
 earthquake and fire research programs including those related to wildfire proliferation research and prevention;
 research and development relating to health, biomedical, and nutritional programs;
 to the extent appropriate, agricultural, geological, biological and life sciences research; and
 materials research, development, and demonstration and policy.

History 
Chairs of the subcommittee:
 Bob Inglis (R), South Carolina, 2005-2007
 Brian Baird (D), Washington, 2007-2009
 Dan Lipinski (D), Illinois, 2009-2011
 Mo Brooks (R), Alabama, 2011–2013
 Larry Bucshon (R), Indiana, 2013-2015
 Barbara Comstock (R), Virginia, 2015-2019
 Haley Stevens (D), Michigan, 2019-present

Members, 117th Congress

Historical membership rosters

115th Congress

116th Congress

References

External links
 Subcommittee on Research and Science Education, official website
 Republican Subcommittee website

Science Research